The subtypes of HIV include two major types, HIV type 1 (HIV-1) and HIV type 2 (HIV-2). HIV-1 is related to viruses found in chimpanzees and gorillas living in western Africa, while HIV-2 viruses are related to viruses found in the sooty mangabey, a vulnerable West African primate. HIV-1 viruses can be further divided into groups M, N, O and P. The HIV-1 group M viruses predominate and are responsible for the AIDS pandemic. Group M can be further subdivided into subtypes based on genetic sequence data. Some of the subtypes are known to be more virulent or are resistant to different medications. Likewise, HIV-2 viruses are thought to be less virulent and transmissible than HIV-1 M group viruses, although HIV-2 is also known to cause AIDS.
One of the obstacles to treatment of the human immunodeficiency virus (HIV) is its high genetic variability.

Major types

HIV-1

HIV-1 is the most common and pathogenic strain of the virus. Over 2 million such infections occur annually. Scientists divide HIV-1 into a major group (Group M) and two or more minor groups, namely Group N, O and possibly a group P. Each group is believed to represent an independent transmission of SIV into humans (but subtypes within a group are not). A total of 39 ORFs are found in all six possible reading frames (RFs) of HIV-1 complete genome sequence, but only a few of them are functional.

Group M
With 'M' for "major", this is by far the most common type of HIV, with more than 90% of HIV/AIDS cases deriving from infection with HIV-1 group M. This major HIV virus which was the source of pre-1960 pandemic viruses originated in the 1920s in Léopoldville, the Belgian Congo, today known as Kinshasa, which is now the capital of the Democratic Republic of Congo (DRC). Its zoonotic origin is SIVcpz, which infects chimpanzees. The M group is subdivided further into clades, called subtypes, that are also given a letter. There are also "circulating recombinant forms" or CRFs derived from recombination between viruses of different subtypes which are each given a number. CRF12_BF, for example, is a recombination between subtypes B and F.
 Subtype A is common in eastern Africa.
 Subtype B is the dominant form in Europe, the Americas, Japan, and Australia. In addition, subtype B is the most common form in the Middle East and North Africa. It may have been exported from Africa when Haitian professionals visited Kinshasa in the 1960s and brought it to Haiti in 1964.
 Subtype C is the dominant form in Southern Africa, Eastern Africa, India, Nepal, and parts of China.
 Subtype D is generally only seen in Eastern and central Africa.
 Subtype E was originally used to describe a strain that is now accounted for as the combined strain CRF01_AE. This means the original, singular, E strain has disappeared, but we know it existed, as it is visible in this combined strain form.
 Subtype F has been found in central Africa, South America and Eastern Europe.
 Subtype G (and the CRF02_AG) have been found in Africa and central Europe.
 Subtype H is limited to central Africa.
 Subtype I was originally used to describe a strain that is now accounted for as CRF04_cpx, with the cpx for a "complex" recombination of several subtypes.
 Subtype J is primarily found in North, Central and West Africa, and the Caribbean
 Subtype K is limited to the Democratic Republic of Congo (DRC) and Cameroon.
 Subtype L is limited to the Democratic Republic of Congo (DRC).

The spatial movement of these subtypes moved along the railways and waterways of the Democratic Republic of Congo (DRC) from Kinshasa to these other areas. These subtypes are sometimes further split into sub-subtypes such as A1 and A2 or F1 and F2. In 2015, the strain CRF19, a recombinant of subtype A, subtype D and subtype G, with a subtype D protease, was found to be strongly associated with rapid progression to AIDS in Cuba. This is not thought to be a complete or final list, and further types are likely to be found.

Group N
The 'N' stands for "non-M, non-O". This group was discovered by a Franco-Cameroonian team in 1998, when they identified and isolated the HIV-1 variant strain, YBF380, from a Cameroonian woman who died of AIDS in 1995. When tested, the YBF380 variant reacted with an envelope antigen from SIVcpz rather than with those of Group M or Group O, indicating it was indeed a novel strain of HIV-1. As of 2015, fewer than 20 Group N infections have been recorded.

Group O
The O ("Outlier") group has infected about 100,000 individuals located in West-Central Africa and is not usually seen outside of that area. It is reportedly most common in Cameroon, where a 1997 survey found that about 2% of HIV-positive samples were from Group O. Its zoonotic origin is SIVgor, which infects gorillas (rather than the more common source, SIVcpz). The group caused some concern because it could not be detected by early versions of the HIV-1 test kits. More advanced HIV tests have now been developed to detect both Group O and Group N.

Group P
In 2009, a newly analyzed HIV sequence was reported to have greater similarity to a simian immunodeficiency virus recently discovered in wild gorillas (SIVgor) than to SIVs from chimpanzees (SIVcpz). The virus had been isolated from a Cameroonian woman residing in France who was diagnosed with HIV-1 infection in 2004. The scientists reporting this sequence placed it in a proposed Group P "pending the identification of further human cases".

HIV-2
HIV-2 has not been widely recognized outside of Africa. The first identification of HIV-2 occurred in 1985 in Senegal by microbiologist Souleymane Mboup and his collaborators. The first case in the United States was in 1987. The first confirmed case of HIV-2 was a Portuguese man who was treated at the London Hospital for Tropical Diseases and later died in 1987. He was believed to have been exposed to the disease in Guinea-Bissau where he lived between 1956 and 1966. His pathological diagnosis at the time was cryptosporidium and enterovirus infection, but an analysis of his stored serum in 1987 found that he was infected with HIV-2.

Many test kits for HIV-1 will also detect HIV-2.

As of 2010, there are eight known HIV-2 groups (A to H). Of these, only groups A and B are pandemic. Group A is found mainly in West Africa, but has also spread globally to Angola, Mozambique, Brazil, India, Europe, and the US. Despite the presence of HIV-2 globally, Group B is mainly confined to West Africa. Despite its relative confinement, HIV-2 should be considered in all patients exhibiting symptoms of HIV that not only come from West Africa, but also anyone who has had any body fluid transfer with a person from West Africa (i.e. needle sharing, sexual contact, etc.).

HIV-2 is closely related to simian immunodeficiency virus endemic in sooty mangabeys (Cercocebus atys atys) (SIVsmm), a monkey species inhabiting the forests of Littoral West Africa. Phylogenetic analyses show that the virus most closely related to the two strains of HIV-2 which spread considerably in humans (HIV-2 groups A and B) is the SIVsmm found in the sooty mangabeys of the Tai forest, in western Ivory Coast.

There are six additional known HIV-2 groups, each having been found in just one person. They all seem to derive from independent transmissions from sooty mangabeys to humans. Groups C and D have been found in two people from Liberia, groups E and F have been discovered in two people from Sierra Leone, and groups G and H have been detected in two people from the Ivory Coast. Each of these HIV-2 strains, for which humans are probably dead-end hosts, is most closely related to SIVsmm strains from sooty mangabeys living in the same country where the human infection was found.

Diagnosis

HIV-2 diagnosis can be made when a patient has no symptoms but positive blood work indicating the individual has HIV. The Multispot HIV-1/HIV-2 Rapid Test is currently the only FDA approved method for such differentiation between the two viruses. Recommendations for the screening and diagnosis of HIV has always been to use enzyme immunoassays that detect HIV-1, HIV-1 group O, and HIV-2. When screening the combination, if the test is positive followed by an indeterminate HIV-1 western blot, a follow up test, such as amino acid testing, must be performed to distinguish which infection is present. According to the NIH, a differential diagnosis of HIV-2 should be considered when a person is of West African descent or has had sexual contact or shared needles with such a person. West Africa is at the highest risk as it is the origin of the virus.

Treatments
HIV-2 has been found to be less pathogenic than HIV-1. The mechanism of HIV-2 is not clearly defined, nor the difference from HIV-1, however the transmission rate is much lower in HIV-2 than HIV-1. Both viruses can lead to AIDS in infected individuals and both can mutate to develop drug resistance. Disease monitoring in patients with HIV-2 includes clinical evaluation and CD4 cell counts, while treatment includes anti-retroviral therapy (ART), nucleoside reverse transcriptase inhibitors (NRTIs), protease inhibitors (PI), and non-nucleoside reverse transcriptase inhibitors (NNRTIs) with the addition of CCR5 co-receptor antagonists and fusion inhibitors.

Choice of initial and/or second-line therapy for HIV-2 has not yet been defined. HIV-2 appears to be resistant to NNRTIs intrinsically, but may be sensitive to NRTIs, though the mechanism is poorly understood. Protease inhibitors have shown variable effect, while integrase inhibitors are also being evaluated.  Combination regimens of the above listed therapies are being looked into as well, also showing variable effect depending on the types of therapies combined. While the mechanisms are not clearly understood for HIV-1 and HIV-2, it is known that they use different pathways and patterns, making the algorithms used to evaluate HIV-1 resistance-associated mutations irrelevant to HIV-2.

Each virus can be contracted individually, or they can be contracted together in what is referred to as co-infection. HIV-2 seems to have lower mortality rates, less severe symptoms and slower progression to AIDS than HIV-1 alone or the co-infection. In co-infection, however, this is largely dependent on which virus was contracted first. HIV-1 tends to out compete HIV-2 for disease progression. Co-infection seems to be a growing problem globally as time progresses, with most cases being identified in West African countries, as well as some cases in the USA. A study found that individuals who acquire HIV-2 before HIV-1 have a slower rate of disease progression, indicating that the proliferation of HIV-1 is limited by the immune response to HIV-2.

Pregnancy
If a pregnant mother is exposed, screening is performed as normal. If HIV-2 is present, a number of perinatal ART drugs may be given as a prophylactic to lower the risk of mother-to-child transmission.  After the child is born, a standard six-week regimen of these prophylactics should be initiated. Breast milk may also contain particles of HIV-2; therefore, breastfeeding is strictly advised against.

Evolution
The rapid evolution of HIV can be attributed to its high mutation rate. During the early stages of mutation, evolution appears to be neutral due to the absence of an evolutionary response. However, when examining the virus in several different individuals, convergent mutations can be found appearing in these viral populations independently.

HIV evolution within a host influences factors including the virus' set-point viral load. If the virus has a low set-point viral load, the host will live longer, and there is a greater probability that the virus will be transmitted to another individual. If the virus has a high set-point viral load, the host will live for a shorter amount of time and there is a lower probability that the virus will be transmitted to another individual. HIV has evolved to maximize the number of infections to other hosts, and this tendency for selection to favor intermediate strains shows that HIV undergoes stabilizing selection.

The virus has also evolved to become more infectious between hosts. There are three different mechanisms that allow HIV to evolve at a population level. One includes the continuous battle to evolve and overcome the immune system which slows down the evolution of HIV and shifts the virus’ focus towards a population level. Another includes the slow evolution of viral load due to viral load mutations being neutral within the host. The last mechanism focuses on the virus' preference to transmit founding viral strains stored during the early stages of infection. This preference of the virus to transmit its stored genome copies explains why HIV evolves more quickly within the host than between hosts.

HIV is evolving to a milder form but is "an awfully long way" from no longer being deadly and new severe variants are still appearing.

Drug resistance mutations
Isolates of HIV-1 and HIV-2 with resistance to antiretroviral drugs arise through natural selection and genetic mutations, which have been tracked and analyzed. The Stanford HIV Drug Resistance Database and the International AIDS Society publish lists of the most important of these; first year listing 80 common mutations, and the latest year 93 common mutations, and made available through the Stanford HIV RT and Protease Sequence Database.

See also 
 HIV superinfection
 HIV/AIDS research
 Discovery and development of CCR5 receptor antagonists
 History of HIV/AIDS

References

External links 

 
 HIV Types at Avert.org
 3D macromolecular structures of HIV-1 at the EM Data Bank(EMDB)
 Geographic distribution of subtyped sequences in the GenBank HIV Database

HIV/AIDS
Sexually transmitted diseases and infections
Infraspecific virus taxa

hi:एचआइवी#प्रमुख प्रकार